Jub Baghan-e Sofla (also Romanized as Jūb Bāghān-e Soflá; also known as Barāftāb) is a village in Direh Rural District, in the Central District of Gilan-e Gharb County, Kermanshah Province, Iran. At the 2006 census, its population was 140, in 33 families.

References 

Populated places in Gilan-e Gharb County